The Isuzu Super Cruiser (kana:いすゞ・スーパークルーザー) is a heavy-duty coach built by Isuzu. The range was primarily available as a tourist coach, but was primarily unavailable with left-hand drive.

Isuzu tourist coaches (predecessors of Super Cruiser) 
BH162 (1959)
BU20PA (1962)
BU30P (1963)
BH20/50P (1969)
BH21P (1973)
CRA (1975)
K-CRA/CSA (1980)
P-LV219 (1984)

Models 
P-LV719 (1986)
U-LV771 (1990)
KC-LV781 (1995)

Model lineup 
HD (Hi-decker) 12m、11.3m
SHD (Super hi-decker) 12m
UFC (Under-floor cockpit) 12m

References

External links 

Cab over vehicles
Coaches (bus)

Isuzu buses
Full-size buses
Vehicles introduced in 1986